Filippo Guarducci (born 25 August 1993) is an Italian rugby union player. His usual position is Flanker. He plays for Mogliano in Top12 since 2012.

From 2012 to 2015 Guarducci was named in the Italy Under 20 squad. In 2015 he was named in Emerging Italy the for the annual World Rugby Tbilisi Cup.

External links 
It's Rugby England Profile
Eurosport Profile
Rugby Profiles

References 

Italian rugby union players
Living people
1993 births
Rugby union wings